Or (My Treasure) is a 2004 drama film starring Dana Ivgy in the title role of Or, a teenager who struggles to be responsible for her prostitute mother Ruthie, played by Ronit Elkabetz. The French-Israeli production premiered on 14 May 2004 at the Cannes Film Festival.

Plot synopsis
A teenager named Or (Dana Ivgy) works a variety of odd jobs to help support herself and her mother. When her mother, Ruthie (Ronit Elkabetz), returns home after a hospital stay, Or tells Ruthie she has found her a job cleaning houses.

However, Ruthie is unmotivated by her new poorly paid job and quickly returns to prostitution.

In the meantime, Or begins a burgeoning romance with her neighbour and childhood friend, Ido. After they sleep together, Ido's mother confronts Ruthie and makes it clear that though she likes Or she does not approve of their relationship.

Her relationship with Ido and his family crumbling, and finding herself unable to make rent and desperate to save her mother from the streets, Or begins to prostitute herself as well, first by offering sexual services to her landlord and finally by joining an escort service.

Reception
Or won 10 awards, including five at the Cannes Film Festival, and was nominated for a further 8. Rotten Tomatoes gave the film a freshness rating of 77%.

Awards and nominations
Israeli Film Academy
Best Actress - Dana Ivgy (won)
Best Art Direction - Avi Fahima (nomination)
Best Director - Keren Yedaya (nomination)
Best Film - (nomination)
Best Screenplay - Keren YedayaSari Ezouz (nomination)
Best Supporting Actress - Ronit Elkabetz (nomination)

Bogota Film Festival
Best Film - Keren Yedaya (nomination)

International Film Festival Bratislava
Grand Prix - Keren YedayaRonit ElkabetzDana Ivgy (won)

Cannes Film Festival
Critics Week Grand Prize - Keren Yedaya (won)
Golden Camera - Keren Yedaya (won)
Prix Regards Jeune Award for Best Feature Film - Keren Yedaya (won)
SACD Screenwriting Award - Keren YedayaSari Ezouz (won)
Young Critics Award for Best Feature - Keren Yedaya (won)

European Film Awards
European Discovery of the Year - Keren Yedaya (nomination)

Jerusalem Film Festival
Wolgin Award for Best Israeli Feature - Keren Yedaya (nomination)

Mexico City International Contemporary Film FestivalBest Realisation - Keren Yedaya (won)Best Actress - Ronit Elkabetz shared with Dana Ivgy (won)

Palm Springs International Film FestivalNew Voices/New Visions Special Jury Mention'' - Keren Yedaya (won)

Cast
Dana Ivgy as Or
Ronit Elkabetz as Ruthie
Katia Zinbris as Rachel
Meshar Cohen as Ido

References

External links

LA Times review

2004 films
Israeli drama films
French drama films
Films shot in Israel
2000s Hebrew-language films
HIV/AIDS in French films
Films about prostitution in Israel
Caméra d'Or winners
2000s French films